Miles M.26 was the designation used to cover the family of X-series design proposals, for long-range transport aircraft. The common factors of most X design proposals were the use of a blended wing body and engines buried in the wings, based on principles patented by Nicolas Woyevodsky. A sub-scale prototype of the X.9 proposal was constructed, designated the Miles M.30.

Variants
Data from: Miles aircraft since 1925
X.2
The X.2 design was first published in Flight in 1938, from work begun in 1936. A projected 300 mph 38-seat transport of about 48,000 lb loaded with 1,000 mile range, it did not use a lifting body fuselage. Initial design powered by four unspecified  air-cooled Rolls-Royce piston engines. Span , gross weight . Met with a cool reaction by the Air Ministry only receiving a paltry £25,000 development contract and a wooden mock-up to Specification 42/37.
X.3A projected six-engined variant.
X.4 to X.8 Variants of the X blended wing theme which didn't proceed further than the concept stage, including an eight-engined transatlantic airliner. (X.8)
X.9A design for a four-engined transport, submitted to the Ministry of Aircraft Production (MAP) in Autumn of 1942, powered by four Rolls-Royce Griffon V-12 piston engines and fitted with retractable tricycle undercarriage.
X.10 A small twin-engined airliner / transport, following the blended wing concept but with externally mounted engines.
X.11After the Brabazon Committee released the Type I specification (later developed into Air Ministry Specification 2/44) for the post-war transatlantic airliner, only to Bristol, F.G. Miles unofficially submitted a design based on the Xseries of blended wing aircraft. The X.11 was to be eight-engined, with high cruising speed (for 1943), high wing loading and low power loading, seating at least 50 passengers, but was rejected. (Span , gross weight ).
X.12 A bomber version of the X.11
X.13 A troop transport version of the X.11
This submission was also summarily rejected.
X.15A revised X.14, to be powered by six Napier Sabre H-24 in-line engines.
Miles M.30 X-Minor sub-scale aerodynamic test-bed / research aircraft for the X.9 project.

Specifications (M.26 X.9)

References

External links
https://books.google.co.uk/books?id=M3NhrPVyQiIC&pg=PA44&lpg=PA44&dq=Miles+x+airliner&source=bl&ots=VLul-Qi7ly&sig=cgEHOKZ7zxjn8cmo3-cNA34f0LQ&hl=en&sa=X&ved=0ahUKEwjIxLafmZnXAhVGI8AKHX4YCmsQ6AEITTAI#v=onepage&q=Miles%20x%20airliner&f=false

 Abandoned civil aircraft projects
Aviation history of the United Kingdom
1940s British airliners